The districts of England (also known as local authority districts or local government districts to distinguish from unofficial city districts) are a level of subnational division of England used for the purposes of local government. As the structure of local government in England is not uniform, there are currently four principal types of district-level subdivision. There are a total of 309 districts made up of 36 metropolitan boroughs, 32 London boroughs, 181 two-tier non-metropolitan districts and 58 unitary authorities, as well as the City of London and Isles of Scilly which are also districts, but do not correspond to any of these categories. Some districts are styled as cities, boroughs or royal boroughs; these are purely honorific titles and do not alter the status of the district or the powers of their councils. All boroughs and cities (and a few districts) are led by a mayor who in most cases is a ceremonial figure elected by the district council, but—after local government reform—is occasionally a directly elected mayor who makes most of the policy decisions instead of the council.

History

Before the establishment of districts in the 1890s, the basic unit of local government in England was the parish, overseen by the parish church vestry committee. Vestries dealt with the administration of both parochial and secular governmental matters. Parishes were the successors of the manorial system and historically had been grouped into hundreds, which had exercised some supervising administrative function. However, these powers ebbed away as more and more civic and judicial powers were centred on county towns. From 1834 these parishes were grouped into Poor Law Unions, creating areas for administration of the Poor Law. These areas were later used for census registration and as the basis for sanitary provision. In 1894, based on these earlier subdivisions, the Local Government Act 1894 created urban districts and rural districts as sub-divisions of administrative counties, which had been created in 1889. At the same time, parish-level local government administration was transferred to civil parishes. Another reform in 1900 created 28 metropolitan boroughs as sub-divisions of the County of London.

The setting-down of the current structure of districts in England began in 1965, when Greater London and its 32 London boroughs were created. They are the oldest type of district still in use. In 1974, metropolitan counties and non-metropolitan counties (also known as "shire counties") were created across the rest of England and were split into metropolitan districts and non-metropolitan districts.

The status of the London boroughs and metropolitan districts changed in 1986, when they absorbed the functions and some of the powers of the metropolitan county councils and the Greater London Council, which were abolished. Since 2000, powers are again shared (on a different basis) with the Greater London Authority.

During the 1990s a further kind of district was created, the unitary authority, which combined the functions and status of county and district.

Metropolitan boroughs

Metropolitan boroughs are a subdivision of a metropolitan county. These are similar to unitary authorities, as the metropolitan county councils were abolished in 1986. Most of the powers of the county councils were devolved to the districts but some services are run by joint boards and organisations. The districts typically have populations of 174,000 to 1.1 million.

Non-metropolitan districts

Non-metropolitan districts are second-tier authorities, which share power with county councils. They are subdivisions of shire counties and the most common type of district. These districts typically have populations of 25,000 to 200,000.

In this two-tier system, county councils are responsible for some local services, such as education, social services, and roads, while district councils run other services, such as waste collection, local planning, and council housing.

The number of two-tier non-metropolitan districts (also known as shire districts) has varied over time. Initially there were 296; after the creation of single-tier unitary authorities in the 1990s, 2000s, and 2010s, their numbers were reduced to 192.

Unitary authority areas

These are single-tier non-metropolitan districts which are responsible for running all local services in their areas, combining both county and district functions. They were created in the mid-1990s, and often cover large towns and cities as this is deemed to be more efficient than a two-tier structure. In addition, some of the smaller counties such as Rutland, Herefordshire and the Isle of Wight are unitary authorities. There are a total of 56 unitary authorities, including one introduced in 2020.

Unitary authority areas are a type of non-metropolitan district; most are established as individual counties containing a single district, with a district council but no county council. Berkshire is unusual, being a non-metropolitan county with no county council and six unitary authority districts. Cornwall, Durham, the Isle of Wight, Northumberland, Shropshire and Wiltshire were established as counties with a single district, but have non-metropolitan county councils with no district council. In practice, these function in the same way as other unitary authorities.

London boroughs

The London boroughs are sub-divisions of Greater London. They were established in 1965. Between 1965 and 1986 a two-tier structure of government existed in Greater London and the boroughs shared power with the Greater London Council (GLC). When the GLC was abolished in 1986 they gained similar status to the unitary authorities. In 2000 the Greater London Authority was established and a two-tier structure was restored, albeit with a change to the balance of powers and responsibilities.

Each London borough is responsible for many of the services within their area, such as schools, waste management, planning applications, social services, libraries and others.

Map

See also
 List of English districts by population
List of English districts by area
 List of local governments in the United Kingdom

References

 
Districts, English01
Types of subdivision in the United Kingdom